Mankato may refer to a place in the United States:

 Mankato, Minnesota
 Minnesota State University, Mankato
 North Mankato, Minnesota
 Mankato, Kansas
 Mankato, Nebraska